Michelle Osis is an Australian-Canadian film and television composer. She is most noted for her work on the film Bloodthirsty, for which she and Lowell Boland received a Canadian Screen Award nomination for Best Original Score at the 9th Canadian Screen Awards in 2021.

Her other credits have included the films The Skin We're In, Juggernaut, Knuckleball, Harpoon and True Fiction. She was previously a Canadian Screen Award nominee for Best Music in a Non-Fiction Program or Series at the 8th Canadian Screen Awards in 2020 for the television documentary The Corporate Coup d'État.

References

External links

Australian film score composers
Australian women composers
Australian emigrants to Canada
Canadian film score composers
Canadian television composers
Canadian women composers
Canadian women in film
Living people
Year of birth missing (living people)